The 1952–53 season was the 73rd season of competitive football by Rangers.

Overview
Rangers played a total of 46 competitive matches during the 1952–53 season.

Results
All results are written with Rangers' score first.

Scottish League Division A

Scottish Cup

League Cup

Coronation Cup

Appearances

See also
 1952–53 in Scottish football
 1952–53 Scottish Cup
 1952–53 Scottish League Cup
 Coronation Cup

References 

Rangers F.C. seasons
Rangers
Scottish football championship-winning seasons